The Armstrong Cup is the oldest Irish team league competition and has been played every year since 1888, perhaps giving it a claim on the longest running chess competition in the world. The Club is named after William Armstrong BL (1849-1899) who presented the cup in its first season
It is organised by the Leinster Chess Union and is division one of the Leinster leagues. Each team comprises 8 players, and the league comprises 12 teams. Each year the bottom two clubs are relegated, and the top two clubs from the second division Heidenfeld Trophy are promoted. The winners of the Armstrong Cup go forward to participate in the National Club Championships run by the Irish Chess Union. As well as being graded by the ICU, games in the Armstrong Cup are submitted for rating by the International Chess Federation FIDE.

In 1971 the League was divided into top 6 teams who played each other home and away, the remaining teams formed the new division two named the Heidenfeld Trophy with the older Ennis Shield league competition becoming the third division of the Leinster leagues.
In the early 1980s the LCU experimented with having a preliminary round and then dividing the league into 2 section however it returned to the league format.

Winning Clubs

1889–1899
 1889 - Phoenix
 1890 - Clontarf
 1891 - Dublin University
 1892 - Clontarf (Disqualified)
 1893 - Kingstown
 1894 - City
 1895 - Rathmines
 1896 - Dublin University
 1897 - Dublin University
 1898 - Rathmines
 1899 - Blackrock/Booterstown

1900-1909
 1900 - Dublin University
 1901 - Blackrock/Booterstown
 1902 - Blackrock/Booterstown
 1903 - Blackrock/Booterstown
 1904 - Sackville
 1905 - Sackville
 1906 - Sackville
 1907 - Sackville
 1908 - Sackville
 1909 - Sackville

1910–1919
 1910 - Dublin
 1911 - Sackville
 1912 - Sackville
 1913 - Dublin
 1914 - Sackville
 1915 - Sackville
 1916 - None
 1917 - None
 1918 - None
 1919 - None

1920–1929
 1920 - None
 1921 - None
 1922 - Dublin
 1923 - Dublin
 1924 - Dublin
 1925 - Dublin
 1926 - Sackville
 1927 - Dublin
 1928 - Dublin
 1929 - Sackville

1930–1939
 1930 - Dublin
 1931 - Dublin
 1932 - Sackville
 1933 - Dublin
 1934 - Dublin
 1935 - Dublin
 1936 - Blackrock
 1937 - Colmcille
 1938 - Dublin
 1939 - Dublin

1940–1949
 1940 - Colmcille
 1941 - Dublin
 1942 - Sackville
 1943 - Colmcille
 1944 - Dublin
 1945 - Dublin University
 1946 - Rathmines
 1947 - Dublin
 1948 - Dublin
 1949 - Sackville

1950–1959
 1950 - Dublin
 1951 - Sackville
 1952 - Dublin
 1953 - Clontarf
 1954 - Eoghan Ruadh
 1955 - Clontarf
 1956 - Eoghan Ruadh A
 1957 - Sackville
 1958 - Dublin
 1959 - University College Dublin

1960–1969
 1960 - Dublin
 1961 - Dublin
 1962 - Eoghan Ruadh
 1963 - Dublin
 1964 - Collegians
 1965 - Dublin
 1966 - Dublin
 1967 - Dublin
 1968 - Eoghan Ruadh
 1969 - Dublin

1970–1979
 1970 - Dublin
 1971 - Dublin
 1972 - Collegians
 1973 - University College Dublin
 1974 - University College Dublin
 1975 - Collegians
 1976 - University College Dublin
 1977 - University College Dublin
 1978 - Rathmines
 1979 - Collegians

1980–1989
 1980 - University College Dublin
 1981 - Dublin
 1982 - Raheny
 1983 - Raheny
 1984 - Kevin Barry
 1985 - Dundrum
 1986 - Kevin Barry
 1987 - Kevin Barry
 1988 - Kevin Barry
 1989 - Rathmines

1990–1999
 1990 - Kevin Barry
 1991 - Kevin Barry
 1992 - Kevin Barry
 1993 - Rathmines
 1994 - St. Benildus
 1995 - Rathfarnham
 1996 - Rathmines
 1997 - Crumlin
 1998 - Crumlin
 1999 - Bray

2000–2009
 2000 - Bray
 2000 - Crumlin
 2002 - Phibsboro 
 2003 - Phibsboro 
 2004 - Phibsboro A
 2005 - Phibsboro A
 2006 - Rathmines A
 2007 - Rathmines A
 2008 - Phibsboro A
 2009 - Phibsboro

2010–present 
 2010 - Elm Mount A
 2011 - Kilkenny
 2012 - Rathmines A
 2013 - Phibsboro
 2014 - Dublin University
 2015 - Gonzaga
 2016 - Gonzaga
 2017 - Gonzaga
 2018 - Gonzaga
 2019 - Gonzaga

Number of Wins by Club

Italics indicate clubs which are defunct or no longer active.

+ Kevin Barry Chess Club previously called North City Chess Club played in Mountjoy Square, Dublin, disbanded in 1992. 

++ Bootherstown(Blackrock) evolved into Blackrock Chess Club and played in the Carnegie Library in Blackrock, the club is now defunct. 

+++ 1981 Eoghan Ruadh (who played in Merchants Quay, Dublin) and Collegians merged to form Vikings Chess Club, Collegians continued on as a Chess and Go Club.

++++ Crumlin Chess Club, in 2002, played in Rathmines Chess Club, playing as Rathmines/Crumlin up until 2004 until the joined Rathmines.

+++++ St. Benildus and Dundrum Chess Club merged, so perhaps their victories should be counted together

References

Chess in Ireland
Chess competitions